Liu Hongji, titled Duke Xiang of Kui, was a general and officer in early Tang Dynasty of China. He was listed as one of 24 honored founding officials of the Tang Dynasty at Lingyan Pavilion.

In history

Liu Hongji is son of Liu Sheng, a governor of Hezhou prefecture during the Sui Dynasty. He was drafted to the military service during Emperor Yang of Sui's campaigns against Goguryeo, but he was late for the duty, which might lead to a death penalty. He thus intentionally killed a farmer's cow, which was a civil non-death felony. He was arrested for killing the cow by the local government and imprisoned, and avoided the death row. After being released after one year, he became a horse thief. Later, he met Li Shimin, the future Emperor Taizong of Tang, and became Li's close friend.

When Li Yuan (Li Shimin's father and future founding emperor of the Tang Dynasty) decided to rebel against Sui in 617, Liu Hongji and Zhangsun Shunde ambushed and killed Wang Wei and Gao Junya, the two deputy officials of Taiyuan who helped Emperor Yang of Sui spy on Li Yuan, and made it possible for Li Yuan to rebel in Taiyuan. During the rebellion, Liu Hongji defeated Song Laosheng, the Sui general guarding the town of Huoyi. Later, he led his soldiers crossed the Yellow River and occupied the territory north of Wei River. His move cleared the flank for Li Yuan's main force who were attacking the Sui capital Daxing (on the southern bank of Wei River, better known as Chang'an) from the east. Then, he led his men captured Fufeng, a town west of Daxing, and finished the encirclement around Daxing. Wei Wensheng, the Sui general guarding the Daxing area, was defeated by Liu Hongji's force at the Jinguang Gate of Daxing city. After Li Yuan captured Daxing and formally established the Tang Dynasty, Liu Hongji was honored for his outstanding contribution.

From 618 to 622, Liu Hongji took part in Tang's unification wars against Xue Ju, Liu Wuzhou and Liu Heita as a subordinate to Li Shimin. He was titled Duke of Ren for his military achievements. In 624, the court sent Liu Hongji and Li Shentong (Prince of Huai'an) to Binzhou, a frontier town north of Chang'an, to guard the border between Tang and Tujue. He constructed a series of defending fortresses in today's Shaanxi and Gansu provinces. In 627, he was implicated by his friend Prince of Yi'an, Li Xiaochang, who tried to launch a riot against the newly crowned Li Shimin (Emperor Taizong) after the Xuanwu Gate Incident. Liu Hongji lost all his titles and positions. More than one year later, he was promoted again as the prefectural governor of Yizhou. In 635, he moved to Langzhou, also as a prefectural governor, and he was also promoted to Duke of Kui. In 645, he took part in the campaign against Goguryeo led by Emperor Taizong as the chief commander of the vanguard force. He died in 650, one year later than Emperor Taizong. Emperor Gaozong of Tang honored him titles of Chancellor and Grand Commander of Bingzhou.

In popular culture
In folk stories, Liu Hongji was one of the four close guards (along with Yin Kaishan, Duan Zhixuan and Ma Sanbao) to protect Li Shimin when he was the Prince of Qin. During the campaign against Goguryeo, all four guards were killed by Yeon Gaesomun in a battle.

Family
Father:
Liu Sheng: Prefectural governor of Hezhou in Sui Dynasty
Son:
Liu Renshi: Division commander in Left Dianrong Guard, succeeded the title of Duke of Kui
Liu Renjing: foster-son (originally nephew), officer in the Bureau of Agriculture

References

650 deaths
582 births
Tang dynasty generals
Transition from Sui to Tang